Best of Enemies is a Nancy Drew and Hardy Boys Supermystery crossover novel, published in 1991.

After the demolition of the Berlin Wall, an undercover agent working for the highest levels of the United States government system, the "Swallow", becomes a target after landing on U.S. soil. A German espionage agent and a rogue operative are both after the man, and it is up to the Hardys to crack the case. The leads direct the duo to Nancy Drew in Memphis, and her client, Beau Davis, who is accused of stealing a guitar that was once owned by Elvis. The two cases then clash together, and the trio find a connection. Now they must find the culprit and end the mayhem, battling a murderer in the process.

References

External links
Supermystery series books

Supermystery
1991 American  novels
1991 children's books
Novels set in Memphis, Tennessee